Henry Samuel Baird Jr. (May 16, 1800 – April 30, 1875) was an Irish American immigrant, Wisconsin pioneer, lawyer, and politician. He was the first Attorney General of the Wisconsin Territory, appointed by territorial governor Henry Dodge.  He is known as "Father of the Wisconsin Bar," and was said to be the first practicing lawyer in the Wisconsin Territory.

Biography
Born in Dublin, Ireland, Baird moved with his family, at age five, to Pittsburgh, Pennsylvania. He worked in various law firms in Ohio and Pennsylvania—including the law firm of the future governor of Ohio Reuben Wood. Baird moved to Mackinac Island, in the Michigan Territory, in 1822, where he became a teacher.  He moved to Green Bay in 1824, which, at the time, was also part of the Michigan Territory.

In Green Bay, Baird was admitted to the bar in a special ceremony in the courtroom of territorial judge James Duane Doty, and became the first practicing attorney in what would become the Wisconsin Territory. Baird was involved with Indian affairs, negotiating land transactions as a counsel for the Menominee and Ho-Chunk tribes in 1830, he volunteered as a quartermaster with the militia during the Black Hawk War in 1832, and was secretary to U.S. negotiator Henry Dodge at the Treaty of the Cedars in 1836, and was secretary to the council at Lake Poygan in 1848; Baird also served in the Wisconsin Territorial Council, the upper house of the Wisconsin Territorial Legislature, and was the first president of the territorial council; he also served in the first Wisconsin Constitutional Convention of 1846. After Wisconsin statehood, he was the Whig Party nominee for Governor of Wisconsin in 1853, losing badly (this would be the last Wisconsin gubernatorial election in which there was a Whig candidate on the ballot). He served as mayor of Green Bay for two terms, in 1861 and 1862.

Family and personal life
On August 12, 1824, Henry Baird married the 14-year-old Elizabeth Fisher, who had been his favorite student. Elizabeth was born in Prairie du Chien in southwest Wisconsin and had moved with her mother to Mackinac Island as a toddler. She was the child of a British fur trader and a French-Ottawa mother and spoke several languages.  Baird brought his wife from Mackinac Island, by ship, to Green Bay.  Elizabeth's skill at translation and her family connections to the American Indian communities made their home a hub for social life in the territory and contributed to her husband's political success.  Elizabeth later wrote of her life in the territory in "Reminscences of Life in Territorial Wisconsin." Henry and Elizabeth had four daughters, with two surviving to adulthood.

Henry's law office, the Baird Law Office, is a small Greek Revival building that he purchased in 1841. The building was moved and is preserved at Heritage Hill State Park.

Electoral history

Wisconsin Attorney General (1848)

| colspan="6" style="text-align:center;background-color: #e9e9e9;"| General Election, May 8, 1848

Wisconsin Governor (1853)

| colspan="6" style="text-align:center;background-color: #e9e9e9;"| General Election, November 8, 1853

References

Further reading

External links
 

|-

|-

|-

|-

Lawyers from Pittsburgh
Members of the Wisconsin Territorial Legislature
Wisconsin Attorneys General
Mayors of Green Bay, Wisconsin
1800 births
1875 deaths
Irish emigrants to the United States (before 1923)
19th-century American politicians
Wisconsin Whigs
19th-century American lawyers